Senur is a census town in Vellore district in the Indian state of Tamil Nadu.

Demographics
 reckoning in India, Senur had 7,558 dwellers. Men make up 51% of the folk while women make up 49%. Senur has a middling learning rate of 59%, lesser than the homeland average of 59.5%: male learning rate is 66%, and female learning rate is 51%. In Senur, 12% of the folks are under 6 years of age.

References

Cities and towns in Vellore district